The CMYK color model (also known as process color, or four color) is a subtractive color model, based on the CMY color model, used in color printing, and is also used to describe the printing process itself. The abbreviation CMYK refers to the four ink plates used: cyan, magenta, yellow, and key (black).

The CMYK model works by partially or entirely masking colors on a lighter, usually white, background. The ink reduces the light that would otherwise be reflected. Such a model is called subtractive because inks "subtract" the colors red, green and blue from white light. White light minus red leaves cyan, white light minus green leaves magenta, and white light minus blue leaves yellow.

In additive color models, such as RGB, white is the "additive" combination of all primary colored lights, black is the absence of light. In the CMYK model, it is the opposite: white is the natural color of the paper or other background, black results from a full combination of colored inks. To save cost on ink, and to produce deeper black tones, unsaturated and dark colors are produced by using black ink instead of the combination of cyan, magenta, and yellow.

Halftoning 

With CMYK printing, halftoning (also called screening) allows for less than full saturation of the primary colors; tiny dots of each primary color are printed in a pattern small enough that humans perceive a solid color. Magenta printed with a 20% halftone, for example, produces a pink color, because the eye perceives the tiny magenta dots on the large white paper as lighter and less saturated than the color of pure magenta ink. Halftoning allows for a continuous variability of each color, which enables continuous color mixing of the primaries. Without halftoning, each primary would be binary, i.e. on/off, which only allows for the reproduction of seven colors: the three primaries, three secondaries and gray/black.

Comparison to CMY 

The CMYK color model is based on the CMY color model, which omits the black ink. However, the imperfect black generated by mixing commercially practical cyan, magenta, and yellow inks is unsatisfactory, so four-color printing uses black ink in addition to the subtractive primaries. Common reasons for using black ink include:
 In traditional preparation of color separations, a red keyline on the black line art marked the outline of solid or tint color areas. In some cases a black keyline was used when it served as both a color indicator and an outline to be printed in black because usually the black plate contained the keyline. The K in CMYK represents the keyline or black plate, also sometimes called the key plate.
 Text is typically printed in black and includes fine detail (such as serifs). To avoid even slight blurring when reproducing text (or other finely detailed outlines) using three inks would require impractically accurate registration.
 A combination of 100% cyan, magenta, and yellow inks soaks the paper with ink, making it slower to dry, causing bleeding, or (especially on low quality paper such as newsprint) weakening the paper so much that it tears.
 Although a combination of 100% cyan, magenta, and yellow inks should, in theory, completely absorb the entire visible spectrum of light and produce a perfect black, practical inks fall short of their ideal characteristics, and the result is actually a dark muddy color that does not quite appear black. Black ink absorbs more light and yields much better blacks.
 Black ink is less expensive than the combination of colored inks that makes black.

A black made with just CMY inks is sometimes called a composite black.

When a very dark area is wanted, a colored or gray CMY "bedding" is applied first, then a full black layer is applied on top, making a rich, deep black; this is called rich black. 

The amount of black to use to replace amounts of the other inks is variable, and the choice depends on the technology, paper and ink in use. Processes called under color removal, under color addition, and gray component replacement are used to decide on the final mix; different CMYK recipes will be used depending on the printing task.

Other printer color models 
CMYK or process color printing is contrasted with spot color printing, in which specific colored inks are used to generate the colors appearing on paper. Some printing presses are capable of printing with both four-color process inks and additional spot color inks at the same time. High-quality printed materials, such as marketing brochures and books, often include photographs requiring process-color printing, other graphic effects requiring spot colors (such as metallic inks), and finishes such as varnish, which enhances the glossy appearance of the printed piece.

CMYK are the process printers which often have a relatively small color gamut. Processes such as Pantone's proprietary six-color (CMYKOG) Hexachrome considerably expand the gamut. Light, saturated colors often cannot be created with CMYK, and light colors in general may make visible the halftone pattern. Using a CcMmYK process, with the addition of light cyan and magenta inks to CMYK, can solve these problems, and such a process is used by many inkjet printers, including desktop models.

Comparison with RGB displays 

Comparisons between RGB displays and CMYK prints can be difficult, since the color reproduction technologies and properties are very different. A computer monitor mixes shades of red, green, and blue light to create color pictures. A CMYK printer instead uses light-absorbing cyan, magenta, and yellow inks, whose colors are mixed using dithering, halftoning, or some other optical technique.

Similar to monitors, the inks used in printing produce a color gamut that is "only a subset of the visible spectrum" although both color modes have their own specific ranges. As a result of this, items which are displayed on a computer monitor may not completely match the look of items which are printed if opposite color modes are being combined in both mediums. When designing items to be printed, designers view the colors which they are choosing on an RGB color mode (their computer screen), and it is often difficult to visualize the way in which the color will turn out post-printing because of this.

Spectrum of printed paper 
To reproduce color, the CMYK color model codes for absorbing light rather than emitting it (as is assumed by RGB). The "K" component absorbs all wavelengths and is therefore achromatic. The cyan, magenta, and yellow components are used for color reproduction and they may be viewed as the inverse of RGB. Cyan absorbs red, magenta absorbs green, and yellow absorbs blue (-R,-G,-B).

Conversion 

Since RGB and CMYK spaces are both device-dependent spaces, there is no simple or general conversion formula that converts between them. Conversions are generally done through color management systems, using color profiles that describe the spaces being converted. An ICC profile defines the bidirectional conversion between a neutral "profile connection" color space (CIE XYZ or Lab) and a colorspace we are interested in, in this case both RGB and CMYK. The precision of the conversion depends on the profile itself, the exact methodology, and because the gamuts do not generally match, the rendering intent and constraints such as ink limit.

ICC profiles, internally built out of lookup tables and other transformation functions, are capable of handling many effects of ink blending. One example is the dot gain, which show up as non-linear components in the color-to-density mapping. More complex interactions such as Neugebauer blending can be modelled in higher-dimension lookup tables.

The problem of computing a colorimetric estimate of the color that results from printing various combinations of ink has been addressed by many scientists. A general method that has emerged for the case of halftone printing is to treat each tiny overlap of color dots as one of 8 (combinations of CMY) or of 16 (combinations of CMYK) colors, which in this context are known as Neugebauer primaries. The resultant color would be an area-weighted colorimetric combination of these primary colors, except that the Yule–Nielsen effect of scattered light between and within the areas complicates the physics and the analysis; empirical formulas for such analysis have been developed, in terms of detailed dye combination absorption spectra and empirical parameters.

Standardization of printing practices allow for some profiles to be predefined. One of them is the US Specifications for Web Offset Publications, which has its ICC color profile built into some software including Microsoft Office (as Agfa RSWOP.icm).

See also 
 CMY color model
 CcMmYK color model
 Cycolor
 RGB color model
 Grey component replacement
 Jacob Christoph Le Blon
 SWOP CMYK standard
 Color management

References

External links 

XCmyk– CMYK to RGB Calculator with source code
 Color Space Fundamentals– animated illustration of RGB vs. CMYK

Color space
Printing
Printing terminology